Kennett Ridge is a rocky ridge,  long, which descends eastward from the northeast end of Midnight Plateau in the Darwin Mountains of Antarctica. It was mapped by the Victoria University of Wellington Antarctic Expedition (1962–63) and named for James P. Kennett, a geologist with the expedition.

References

Ridges of Oates Land